Estádio Olímpico Regional Arnaldo Busatto, sometimes nicknamed Ninho das Cobras (meaning Snake Nest) is a multi-use stadium in Cascavel, Brazil. It is currently used mostly for football matches and hosts the home games of Cascavel Clube Recreativo and Futebol Clube Cascavel, and hosted the home games of Cascavel Esporte Clube. The stadium is able to hold 28,125 people, and was built in 1982.

The stadium is owned by the Cascavel City Hall. The stadium is named after Arnaldo Busatto, who was an alderman (vereador, in Portuguese language), state deputy and federal deputy.

History
In 1982, the works on the stadium were completed. The inaugural match was played on November 10 of that year, when São Paulo beat Cascavel 1-0. The first goal of the stadium was scored by São Paulo's Paulo César. The stadium's attendance record currently stands at 35,000, set in the inaugural match.

References

Enciclopédia do Futebol Brasileiro, Volume 2 - Lance, Rio de Janeiro: Aretê Editorial S/A, 2001.

External links
Templos do Futebol

Football venues in Paraná (state)
Cascavel
Sports venues in Paraná (state)